Ayda Field (born Ayda Sabahat Evecan, May 17, 1979) is a Turkish-American actress. She is best known for being a regular panellist on British television show Loose Women, a judge on the British The X Factor, alongside her husband, singer Robbie Williams, and for her roles in Fresh Meat and Days of Our Lives.

Early life
Field was born in Los Angeles, California, to a Turkish father Haldun Evecan, and an American mother, film producer Gwen Field. Her father is Muslim and her mother is Jewish.

She attended Harvard-Westlake School, from which she graduated in 1997.

Television career
Field first became known on the NBC soap opera Days of Our Lives, but has subsequently specialised in comedy roles. She was a regular on Blue Collar TV, guest starred in the sitcom Eve and appeared as Jeannie Whatley on NBC's Studio 60 on the Sunset Strip. On the Fox sitcom Back to You, she played Montana Diaz Herrera (aka Sally Lerner), News 9's weather woman. She  also appeared in ten episodes of Season One.

Field joined the cast of a sitcom pilot titled Making It Legal (playing a lawyer named "Elise") but ABC did not pick up the pilot. In June 2008, she was cast in the female lead on ABC's untitled David Kohan/Max Mutchnick comedy pilot, replacing Sarah Lafleur.

Field made her UK TV debut in the final series of Fresh Meat in 2016. In that year, she appeared in the ITV/Netflix series Paranoid. Also in 2016, Field joined ITV's Loose Women as a guest panellist.

In 2018, she joined The X Factor UK judging panel alongside her husband Robbie Williams, show creator Simon Cowell and One Direction's Louis Tomlinson where she replaced Sharon Osbourne.

Personal life
Field married English singer-songwriter Robbie Williams at his home in Mulholland Estates, Beverly Hills on August 7, 2010. They have four children.

Filmography

Film

Television

References

External links
 
 

1979 births
Living people
American expatriates in England
American film actresses
American television actresses
American people of Turkish descent
American podcasters
Actresses from Los Angeles
Columbia University alumni
Harvard-Westlake School alumni
American people of Jewish descent
20th-century American actresses
21st-century American actresses